John Maple may refer to:

 John Blundell Maple, English business magnate who owned the furniture maker Maple & Co.
John Maple (furniture maker), founder of the furniture makers and upholsterers Maple & Co.
Jack Maple (1952–2001), New York City Police Deputy Commissioner

See also
John Maples (1943–2012), British politician